Grace Young may refer to:

 Grace Kama'iku'i Young Rooke (born 1808), Hawaiian high chieftess
 Grace Chisholm Young (born 1868), English mathematician
 Grace Young (author), Chinese cuisine cookbook author
 Grace Young (field hockey) (born 2002), Australian field hockey player